Sarangapur may refer to:
 Sarangapur, Jagtial district, a village in Telangana, India
 Sarangapur, Nirmal district, a village in Telangana, India

See also
 Sarangpur (disambiguation)